Lovers' lane is a generic term for a secluded area where people go (typically by car) to kiss or make out. 

Lovers Lane may also refer to:

Lovers' Lane (1924 film), an American silent romantic comedy film
Lovers Lane (1999 film), a slasher film
Lovers Lane (2005 film), a pornographic film
"Lovers' Lane" (Roseanne), a first-season episode of the TV show Roseanne
"Lover's Lane", a first-season episode of Cold Case
Lovers Lane station, a light rail station in Dallas, Texas
Lovers Lane (album), 1992 debut album of M. C. Brains